Lewis Township is a civil township in Bottineau County in the U.S. state of North Dakota. As of the 2010 census, its population was 34.

References

Townships in Bottineau County, North Dakota
Populated places established in 1910
Townships in North Dakota